SS Atlantus is the most famous of the twelve concrete ships built by the Liberty Ship Building Company in Brunswick, Georgia, United States, during and after World War I.

The steamer was launched on 5 December 1918, and was the second concrete ship constructed in the World War I Emergency Fleet. The war had ended a month earlier, and so work on completing her was put on slow. She completed her sea trials (a 400-500 mile trip) and sailed to Wilmington on her maiden voyage on 26 May 1919 for final touches, prior to sailing for New York. The Liberty Ship Building Company had their headquarters in Wilmington. She was built for service between New York and the West Indies.

The Atlantus was used to transport American troops back home from Europe and also to transport coal in New England. After two years of service, the ship was retired in 1920 to a salvage yard in Virginia.

In 1926, Colonel Jesse Rosenfeld purchased the Atlantus for use in the creation of a ferry dock (for a route now served by the Cape May – Lewes Ferry) out of her and two of her sister ships. The plan was to dig a channel to the shore where the Atlantus would be placed, and the other two ships would be placed in a Y formation, creating a slip for a ferry to dock. In March 1926, the groundbreaking ceremonies were held for the construction of the ferry dock. The Atlantus was repaired and towed to Cape May. On June 8 of the same year, a storm hit and the ship broke free of her moorings and ran aground 150 feet off the coast of Sunset Beach. Several attempts were made to free the ship, but none were successful.

At one time there was a billboard painted on the side of the ship advertising boat insurance. Since her sinking, her slowly deteriorating hull has drawn tourists, although little of her is left visible above the water line. The wreckage is currently split in three pieces. The stern is the most visible section, the middle is completely submerged, and the bow can only be viewed at low tide.

References

External links

 

 

Shipwrecks of the New Jersey coast
World War I merchant ships of the United States
Concrete ships
Ships built in Brunswick, Georgia
1918 ships
Maritime incidents in 1926
Tourist attractions in Cape May County, New Jersey